Route 369 is a provincial highway located in the Capitale-Nationale region in south-central Quebec. The highway runs from Sainte-Catherine-de-la-Jacques-Cartier and ends in the Beauport sector of Quebec City at the junctions of Autoroute 40 and Route 360. The highway serves also CFB Valcartier military base located just off Autoroute 573.

Towns located along Route 369

 Quebec City including Beauport, Charlesbourg and Loretteville 
 Val-Belair
 Courcelette
 Shannon
 Sainte-Catherine-de-la-Jacques-Cartier

See also
 List of Quebec provincial highways

External links
 Official Transports Quebec Map 
 Route 369 on Google Maps

369
Roads in Capitale-Nationale
Streets in Quebec City